Shish may refer to:

SHISH, the Albanian intelligence service

Food
Shish is a Turkish word meaning skewer, and many meat dishes accordingly have the word in their name.

Shish kebab
Shish taouk
Shish taouk (Montreal).

People
Gal Shish, Israeli footballer
Vasily Shish, Belarusian kickboxer
Hairy Moccasin (Crow: Esh-sup-pee-me-shish), a Crow scout for George Armstrong Custer

Places
Shish Deh, a city in Iran
Shish River in Omsk Oblast, Russia
Sheesh Mahal (Lahore), a fort built by Mughal emperor Shah Jahan
Other buildings also called Sheesh Mahal

Popular culture
Shish Boom Bam, a 1994 album by the Rustic Overtones
A misunderstanding of the dog breed Shih Tzu